Sky Express, legal name Cretan Aviation Operations Aviation and Commercial Societe Anonyme, is a Greek airline headquartered in Heraklion International Airport. It was established in 2005 and operates a number of flights, serving 35 domestic and eight international destinations.

History 

The airline was established in early 2005 by Cpt. Miltiadis Tsagkarakis, former Olympic Airlines director general and pilot, and George Mavrantonakis, former Olympic Airlines chief operating officer and accountable manager as well as advisor to the company president. Operations commenced in July 2005, including scheduled, charter, cargo, air taxi, emergency medical services, excursion and sightseeing flights. Sky Express Aircargo was later established as a joint venture with the Finaval Group and dedicated to cargo transport between Europe and the Far East.

In October 2020, the airline placed a firm order for four Airbus A320neo aircraft (the fleet now includes six of them). In addition, the company introduced a new design for their new Airbus aircraft.

Logo controversy
The airline's initial logo was inspired by the flag of the Cretan State, a semi-independent state under the Ottoman Empire. The flag of the Cretan State was composed of a white cross extending to the edges of the flag, with the upper-hoist canton in red, featuring a white star symbolizing Ottoman sovereignty on the island, and the other squares in blue, symbolizing the Greeks of Crete. The flag has also been adopted as a symbol of the Cretan independence pseudo-movement. The logo was not well-received, and following complaints by the public in Greece, especially Cretans, the logo was changed. The company said it did not consider the flag offensive, since it represented a milestone in the unification of Crete with the Kingdom of Greece, but changed the logo nonetheless to avoid any further confusion.

Corporate affairs

In 2018, Sky Express carried 1 million passengers for the first time.
In 2022, Sky Express carried 3.5 million passengers.

Destinations

As of 2021, Sky Express operates scheduled flights to 35 destinations in Greece and to another eight abroad.

Interline agreements
Sky Express interlines with the following airlines:

 Air France
 Air Serbia
 Air Transat
 American Airlines
 Condor
 Delta Air Lines
 EasyJet
 El Al
 Emirates
 KLM
 Middle East Airlines
 Qatar Airways
 Transavia

Fleet

As of July 2021, Sky Express's fleet consists of the following aircraft:

Historical fleet

In the past, Sky Express also operated the following types:
 ATR 42-300
 BAe Jetstream 41
 Boeing 747-200
 McDonnell Douglas MD-83

Incidents and accidents
 On 12 February 2009, a BAe Jetstream 31 registered SX-SKY experienced a right main gear collapse after landing inbound from Rhodes International Airport. None of the 15 passengers or three crew members were injured, but the aircraft suffered considerable damage to its right landing gear, wing and propeller. The aircraft was deemed beyond economical repair and was written off. The accident was caused by two previous hard landings (out of the previous 27) which had gone unreported. One of the hard landings had caused a fracture in a landing gear cylinder, which spread until the cylinder failed, causing the landing gear to collapse. The aircraft was scrapped at Heraklion Airport in late February 2011.
 On 2 February 2015, a BAe Jetstream 41 aircraft registered SX-DIA, operating flight GQ-100 from Heraklion, experienced a left main gear collapse and runway excursion after a hard landing at Rhodes Diagoras Airport caused by strong winds. None of the 16 passengers or three crew members were injured. The aircraft suffered substantial damage.
 On 21 June 2019, the 3 PM flight from Heraklion to Rhodes Diagoras Airport performed an emergency landing at Karpathos Airport after one of the engines exploded. None of the 47 passengers suffered any injuries.

References

External links
 
 Sky Express fleet from airfleets.net
 Sky Express (Greece) on ch-aviation.com
 Report no 08 / 2009 on SX-SKY by the Air Accident Investigation & Aviation Safety Board
 Report no 03 / 2018 on SX-DIA by the Air Accident Investigation & Aviation Safety Board

Airlines established in 2005
Airlines of Greece
Greek companies established in 2005